Willingham by Stow is a rural village in the West Lindsey district of Lincolnshire, England. The population of the civil parish (known as Willingham) at the 2011 census was 488. To the north is Kexby, to the south is Stow and to the east is Fillingham.

The name 'Willingham' means 'homestead/village of the people of Willa'.

Community
Willingham village hall provides for organisations such as the Parish Council, Women's Institute and the Scouts, and for activities including drama, table tennis and yoga.

The parish church is dedicated to St Helen.

The two village pubs are The Half Moon on High Street and The Fox and Hounds on Gainsborough Road towards Kexby.

The nearest primary school is in Sturton by Stow. The village had a school from roughly 1818 until 1995.

References

External links

 Willingham by Stow website, Willinghambystow.co.uk. Retrieved 12 November 2011

Villages in Lincolnshire
West Lindsey District